SGH Warsaw School of Economics (SGH) is the oldest and most prestigious business school in Poland. 

SGH Warsaw School of Economics was founded in 1906 as a private school under the name August Zieliński Private Trade Courses for Men. On 30 July 1919 it became a separate legal entity and was granted the status of an institution of higher education. The school was renamed Szkoła Główna Handlowa (SGH) in 1933. Following World War II SGH was nationalized and its name changed to Szkoła Główna Planowania i Statystyki (Main School of Planning and Statistics) with an abbreviation of SGPiS. The school regained its pre-war name after the fall of communism in 1991.

SGH Warsaw School of Economics offers courses leading to bachelor's or master's degrees to both full-time and extramural students. It also offers programs for doctoral and postgraduate degrees. Its Finance and Accounting program was ranked among the Top 60 Masters in Management by the Financial Times in 2018.

SGH Warsaw School of Economics cooperates with around 200 higher education institutions around the world within student and staff exchange areas. It is also a member of the CEMS, the LLP Erasmus, the Partnership in International Management network (PIM) and the European University Association EUA.

It is located at the northern edge of the Mokotów district of Warsaw. Bus and tram stops as well as the Pole Mokotowskie metro station are nearby.

Organizational structure
SGH Warsaw School of Economics abandoned the traditional departmental structure segregating students on the basis of their major.

Professors as well as research and teaching programmes are grouped in five Colleges (Collegiums) as well as a number of extra-collegial units, such as the foreign language teaching center.

Courses offered
SGH is a university with no departments. Within full-time and part-time studies, they are conducted in two levels. Bachelor studies, which last for six semesters, lead to a Bachelor's professional title. Holders of such a title may apply for a place and begin Master studies which last for four semesters. To obtain a diploma (as well as credit terms) it is necessary to gather the required minimum points. Individual subjects are divided into mandatory sections for particular fields, optional for those subjects, additional items which help develop the knowledge unrelated to specific subjects, and objects of education common to all economists. Different subjects can have different minimum points for each of these types of items.

SGH full-time students are offered the following fields of study in Polish:
 Economics,
 European Master in Law and Economics,
 European Studies,
 Finance and Accounting,
 Quantitative Methods in Economics and Information Systems,
 Management (Business Administration),
 Public Sector Economics (Public Administration),
 Social Policy,
 Spatial Economic Policy,
 International Economics,
 Big Data.

From 2006/2007 Academic Year SGH Studies are divided into:
 Bachelor's Studies (undergraduate) – 6-semester
 Master's Studies (graduate) – 4-semester
 Doctoral Studies – 6-semester
 System based on ECTS credits

All SGH students study basic macro- and micro- economics, mathematics, statistics, philosophy, social science, law, history, geography, and languages during the first three semesters. After having passed the required examinations for the first three semesters, they then must register for one out of the six offered areas of studies. The BA degree is granted after completing a required number of credits (about six semesters of studies) and the MA (MSc) degree is granted after completing about eight to ten semesters (including six semesters for the BA) which is the maximum period of tuition free study at SGH. It is worth mentioning that students do not have to get the BA before applying for the master's degree, and the time span required for the degree in the given specialisation(s) depends mostly on students themselves, due to the free choice of courses (some limitations apply), professors, and the maximum work load per semester.

International cooperation
SGH is currently working with over 250 foreign universities, as well as with many international organizations. Main partners are universities from the European Union, North America and Asia. Every year, an international students' exchange involves about 500 students of SGH Warsaw School of Economics and the university hosts over 300 students from foreign universities.

Among important international cooperation programs are: LLP Erasmus, CEMS (The Global Alliance in Management Education), Polish-German Academic Forum at SGH, Partnership in International Management (PIM), double diploma programmes (i.e. with Technical University Berlin), bilateral agreements and others.

Student organizations
The Student Union, elective body representing all SGH students in the School's Senate and participating in setting all study regulations, provides students with housing and financial aid as well as organizes a wide range of cultural events.

Collegia
 Collegium of Economic Analysis (Kolegium Analiz Ekonomicznych)
 Collegium of Socio-Economics (Kolegium Ekonomiczno-Społeczne)
 Collegium of World Economy (Kolegium Gospodarki Światowej)
 Collegium of Business Administration (Kolegium Nauk o Przedsiębiorstwie)
 Collegium of Management and Finance (Kolegium Zarządzania i Finansów)

Library
The Library of SGH Warsaw School of Economics is the largest economics library in Poland with its 786 334 volumes of monographs; 216 778 volumes of serials; 983 titles of subscribed periodicals – Polish and foreign, and ca. 30 000 titles of foreign journals in electronic form. 
The SGH Library holdings are organized in several collections. Each collection is available in different departments, on precisely defined conditions: by free access, by library order slips, or by borrowing. Students are allowed to borrow books exclusively from the Students’ Lending Library.

Gospodarka Narodowa: The Polish Journal of Economics

Gospodarka Narodowa. The Polish Journal of Economics is a quarterly scientific journal publishing leading research across all fields of economics and economic policy. The journal has been established in 1931 and since 2000 is edited at the Collegium of Economic Analysis of the SGH Warsaw School of Economics.

Journal of Public Policy Studies

The Journal of Public Policy Studies (Polish: Studia z Polityki Publicznej) was founded in 2014 at the Collegium of Socio-Economics of the SGH Warsaw School of Economics. It is published quarterly and is focused on public policy science issues.

Sports centre
There are two gyms, a fitness room, a swimming pool and a sauna available for students on the SGH campus. One may sign up for either Physical Education (PE) class or varsity team activities, neither of which is compulsory. PE classes include: soccer, basketball, volleyball, callanetics, aerobics, swimming and dancing. Varsity team activities offered are: karate, skiing, aerobics, rock climbing, tennis, table tennis, track and field sports, sailing, soccer, swimming, volleyball and basketball.

Notable alumni and faculty

Faculty
 Leszek Balcerowicz – Chairman of the National Bank of Poland (2001–07), Deputy Prime Minister of Poland (1989–91, 1997–2000), Minister of Finance of Poland (1989–91, 1997–2000), architect of the free market reforms in Poland
 Joanna Cygler – economist and professor of management 
 Adam Glapiński – Chairman of the National Bank of Poland (2016–22)
 Marek Góra – co-author of the pension system reform in Poland
 Danuta Hübner – European Commissioner for Regional Policy (2004–09), Member of the European Parliament (since 2009)
 Michał Kalecki – called: "one of the most distinguished economists of the 20th century"
 Stanisław Kluza – Minister of Finance of Poland (2006), Chairman of the Polish Financial Supervision Authority (2006–11)<ref</ref>
 Oskar Lange –  economist, econometrician, President of the UN Security Council (1946), and Member of Parliament 
 Janusz Piechociński – Deputy Prime Minister of Poland (2012–15), Minister of Economy of Poland (2012–15)
 Dariusz Rosati – Minister of Foreign Affairs of Poland (1995–97), Member of the European Parliament (2004–09, 2014–19)
 Stanisław Wojciechowski – President of the Republic of Poland (1922–26)
 Andrzej Sławiński – a member of the Council of Monetary Policies since 2004 and a fellow of Collegium Invisibile.

Alumni
The majority of Ministers of Finance in the governments of the III Republic of Poland were SGH alumni, including all from 1988 to 1997.
 Leszek Balcerowicz – economist
 Elżbieta Bieńkowska – European Commissioner for Internal Market and Services (since 2014), Deputy Prime Minister of Poland (2013–14), Minister of Regional Development of Poland (2007–13), Minister of Infrastructure and Development of Poland (2013–14)
 Marek Borowski – Deputy Prime Minister of Poland (1993–94), Minister of Finance of Poland (1993–94), Marshal of the Sejm of Poland (2001–04)
 Joanna Cygler – economist
 Jacek Czaputowicz – Minister of Foreign Affairs of Poland (since 2018)
 Barbara Czarniawska – organization scholar, recipient of the Wihuri International Prize (2003)
 Adam Glapiński – economist, chairman of the National Bank of Poland
 Christopher A. Hartwell – professor, former President of CASE-Center for Social and Economic Research, advisor on economics transition
 Danuta Hübner – politician
 Stanisław Kluza – economist
 Grzegorz Kołodko – Deputy Prime Minister of Poland (1994–97, 2002–03) and Minister of Finance of Poland (1994–97, 2002–03)
 Leon Koźmiński – economist, patron of Kozminski University
 Maciej Kranz – Silicon Valley executive, Vice President for Cisco Systems
 Andrzej Olechowski – Minister of Finance of Poland (1992), Minister of Foreign Affairs of Poland (1993–95), co-founder of Civic Platform
 Józef Oleksy – Prime Minister of Poland (1995–96), Deputy Prime Minister of Poland (2004), Minister of Internal Affairs and Administration of Poland (2004), Marshal of the Sejm of Poland (1993–95, 2004–05)
 Janusz Piechociński – politician
 Marek Rocki – former Rector (1999–2002, 2002–2005 and 2016–2020), member of the Senate of Poland (2005–2019)
 Dariusz Rosati – politician, former Minister of Foreign Affairs of Poland
 Wiesław Rozłucki – President of the Warsaw Stock Exchange (1991–2006)
 Michał Rutkowski – economist, co-author of the pension system reform in Poland, director in the World Bank in Washington, DC
 Stefan Starzyński – president of Warsaw from 1934 to the fall of the city in World War II in 1939
 Edward Szczepanik – last Prime Minister of the Government of the Polish Republic in Exile
 Halina Wasilewska-Trenkner – former finance minister Republic of Poland (2001), member of Monetary Policy Council (2004–10)

See also
 Polish Economy Hall of Fame
 List of business schools in Europe

References

External links

 
 International Centre at the SGH Warsaw School of Economics
 SGH Ranking at Eduniversal

 
Business schools in Poland
Educational institutions established in 1906
Economics schools
Mokotów
1906 establishments in Poland